The Church of Saint Astvatsatsin  or Church of the Holy Mother of God is a 17th-century Armenian church in the Valley of the Araxes along the Aras river in Jolfa, East Azerbaijan, Iran near Darashamb.

References

See also 
 Saint Stepanos Monastery, an Armenian monastery about 2 kilometers southeast.
 Julfa Armenian cemetery, an early modern Armenian cemetery 10 kilometers east, in the Nakhchivan region of the republic of Azerbaijan.

Armenian Apostolic churches in Iran
World Heritage Sites in Iran
History of East Azerbaijan Province
Buildings and structures in East Azerbaijan Province